Chemene Sinson (born 10 March 1964) is a former synchronized swimmer from Barbados. She competed in the women's solo competition at the 1984 Summer Olympics.

References 

1964 births
Living people
Barbadian synchronized swimmers
Olympic synchronized swimmers of Barbados
Synchronized swimmers at the 1984 Summer Olympics